Founded in 1992, Walailak University (WU.) (Thai: มหาวิทยาลัยวลัยลักษณ์) is a public university located in Tha Sala District, Nakhon Si Thammarat Province, Thailand. Although state funded, Walailak University is given a high level of autonomy, unusual among Thai public universities.

The university was named after Princess Chulabhorn Walailak.

Admissions policy

First-year undergraduate students gain admission under the quota system for secondary school graduates from the 14 southern provinces or by the national entrance examination administered by the Ministry of Education. Under the quota system secondary school graduates who fulfill the academic criteria set by the university gain admission without having to sit the entrance examination. Other students are admitted on the basis of their marks gained in the national examination.

Faculties 
Walailak University is organized into 14 schools and faculties: 
 College of Graduate Studies
 School of Agricultural Technology
 School of Allied Health Sciences
 School of Architecture and Design
 School of Dentistry
 School of Education and Learning Innovation
 School of Engineering and Resources
 School of Informatics
 School of Liberal Arts
 School of Management
 School of Medicine
 School of Nursing
 School of Pharmacy
 School of Political Science and Law
 School of Public Health
 School of Sciences

Colleges 
Walailak University is organized into 3 colleges : 
 Agrarajakumari College of Veterinary Medicine
 Walailak University International College
 Walailak University International College of Dentistry

International cooperations 
 World Association for Cooperative Education
 Association of Universities of Asia and the Pacific
 International Association of University Presidents
 Association of Southeast Asian Institutions of Higher Learning

Memoranda of understanding
  Australia
 Edith Cowan University
 Murdoch University
  Austria
 Salzburg University of Applied Sciences
  People's Republic of China
 Chinese Academy of Agricultural Sciences
 Chongqing University
 Chongqing University of Posts and Telecommunications
 Harbin Engineering University
 Kunming Medical University
 South China Agricultural University
  France
 Paul Valéry University, Montpellier III
  Germany
 University of Heidelberg
  Hong Kong, China
 University of Hong Kong
  Indonesia
 Gadjah Mada University
 Sriwijaya University
 State University of Malang
 Tadulako University
 University of North Sumatra
  Italy
 University of Modena and Reggio Emilia
  Japan
 Hokkaido University
 Josai University
 Kogakuin University
 Meiji Pharmaceutical University
 Toho University
 Tokyo University of Marine Science and Technology
 International Institute of Applied Informatics http://www.iaiai.org/top/ http://www.iaiai.org/top/
  Malaysia
 Universiti Malaysia Perlis
 Universiti Putra Malaysia
 Universiti Sains Malaysia
 Universiti Teknologi MARA
 Universiti Utara Malaysia
 University of Malaya
  Pakistan
 King Edward Medical University
  Philippines
 Central Luzon State University
 University of the Philippines Los Baños
  South Korea
 Dongseo University
  Taiwan
 National Pingtung University of Science and Technology
  United States of America
 University of Wisconsin–Madison
  Vietnam
 Can Tho University of Medicine and Pharmacy
 Dong Thap University
 Hai Phong University
 Hanoi University of Agriculture
 University of Da Nang
 Vinh University
  United Kingdom
 University of Essex

Mascot
The natural symbol of the university is the shady Praduu tree (Pterocarpus indicus Willd.) which grows in abundance in the southern forests.

University colours: orange and purple

Orange is the colour for Thursday, which is the day of the week on which Princess Chulapornwalailak was born.

Purple is the official colour of the Province of Nakhonsithammarat where the university is. The provincial colour is derived from the personal colour of Phra Rattanatachamuni, abbot of Thapoh Temple and famous education reformer and innovator of the southern region of Thailand in the reign of King Rama V, who is locally regarded as the pioneer of modern education in the south.

External links 
Walailak University
Walailak University Hospital Center

Universities in Thailand
Educational institutions established in 1992
Nakhon Si Thammarat province
1992 establishments in Thailand